is a Japanese voice actor affiliated with Aoni Production.

Voice Acting

Voice roles 
Stellvia of the Universe (2003 TV series), Tony Omaezaki
Onegai Twins (2003 TV series), Uehera
Kidou Senshi Gundam SEED Destiny (2004 TV series), Nishizawa
My-HiME (2004 TV series), Takumi Tokiha
My-Otome (2005 TV series), Takumi Tokiha

Episodic characters in
Beyblade
Black Cat
Bobobo-bo Bo-bobo
Chobits
Kimi ga Nozomu Eien
Samurai Gun
Scrapped Princess

References

External links

Yugo Takahashi at Aoni Production

Year of birth missing (living people)
Living people
Japanese male voice actors
Male voice actors from Tokyo
Aoni Production voice actors